Rutland Regional Medical Center is the second largest hospital and the largest community hospital in Vermont. Located in Rutland, Vermont, it opened in 1896.

Rutland Hospital officially opened on September 6, 1896, with four physicians and ten beds. Major renovations and additions were completed in 1956 and 1989.  The hospital's name was officially changed to Rutland Regional Medical Center in 1982.  The hospital now has a main campus with 144 beds, as well as several other facilities throughout the Rutland region.  In fiscal year 2018, Rutland Regional had over 33,000 emergency department visits, 7.000 inpatient admissions, and 300 births.  Claudio Fort was named president and CEO in 2018.

References

External links

Hospital buildings completed in 1896
Hospitals in Vermont
Buildings and structures in Rutland, Vermont
1896 establishments in Vermont